PEN Ackerley Prize (or, J. R. Ackerley Prize for Autobiography) is awarded annually by English PEN for a literary autobiography of excellence, written by an author of British nationality and published during the preceding year. The winner receives £3,000.  In recent years, the winner has been announced at the annual English PEN summer party.

The prize was established by Nancy West, née Ackerley, sister of English author and editor J. R. Ackerley, and was first awarded in 1982.

The prize is judged by the trustees of the J. R. Ackerley Trust; biographer and historian Peter Parker (Chair), writer and painter Colin Spencer, author Georgina Hammick and writer and critic Claire Harman. There is no formal submission process for the award — judges simply "call in" books to be added to their longlist.

Recipients

 1982: Edward Blishen, Shaky Relations
 1983: Joint winners:
Kathleen Dayus, Her People
Ted Walker, High Path
 1984: Richard Cobb, Still Life
 1985: Angelica Garnett, Deceived with Kindness
 1986: Dan Jacobson, Time and Time Again
 1987: Diana Athill, After the Funeral
 1988: Anthony Burgess, Little Wilson and Big God
 1989: John Healy, The Grass Arena
 1990: Germaine Greer, Daddy We Hardly Knew You
 1991: Paul Binding, St Martin's Ride
 1992: John Osborne, Almost a Gentleman
 1993: Barry Humphries, More, Please 
 1994: Blake Morrison, When Did You Last See Your Father?
 1995: Paul Vaughan, Something in Linoleum
 1996: Eric Lomax, The Railway Man
 1997: Tim Lott, The Scent of Dried Roses
 1998: Katrin Fitzherbert, True to Both Myselves
 1999: Margaret Forster, Precious Lives
 2000: Mark Frankland, Child of My Time
 2001: Lorna Sage, Bad Blood
 2002: Michael Foss, Out of India: A Raj Childhood
 2003: Jenny Diski, Stranger on a Train
 2004: Bryan Magee, Clouds of Glory: A Hoxton Childhood
 2005: Jonathan Gathorne-Hardy, Half an Arch
 2006: Alan Bennett, Untold Stories
 2007: Brian Thompson, Keeping Mum
 2008: Miranda Seymour, In My Father's House
 2009: Julia Blackburn, The Three of Us
 2010: Gabriel Weston, Direct Red: A Surgeon's View of Her Life-or-Death Profession
 2011: Michael Frayn, My Father’s Fortune
 2012: Duncan Fallowell, How to Disappear
 2013: Richard Holloway, Leaving Alexandria: A Memoir of Faith and Doubt (Canongate)
 2014: Sonali Deraniyagala, Wave (Virago)
 2015: Henry Marsh, Do No Harm: Stories of Life, Death and Brain Surgery (Weidenfeld & Nicolson)
 2016: Alice Jolly, Dead Babies and Seaside Towns
 2017: Amy Liptrot, The Outrun (Canongate)
 2018: Richard Beard, The Day That Went Missing (Harvill Secker)
 2019: Yrsa Daley-Ward, The Terrible (Penguin)
 2020: Alison Light, A Radical Romance: A Memoir of Love, Grief and Consolation (Fig Tree)
2021: Claire Wilcox, Patch Work: A Life Amongst Clothes (Bloomsbury)
2022: Frances Stonor Saunders, The Suitcase: Six Attempts to Cross a Border (Jonathan Cape)

References

External links
 Official website.

A
Biography awards
Awards established in 1982
1982 establishments in the United Kingdom